Sharmin Ali (born 8 August 1988) is an Indian actress, author, and entrepreneur. Sharmin has written a book called YOU (You Own Urself). An engineer by profession, she is best known as the founder of the Artrightis Theatre Group (ART-RIGHT-IS), based in Bangalore, India.

Early life and education 
Sharmin Ali was born in West Bengal, India. She completed her schooling at Delhi Public School, R. K. Puram. As a child, Sharmin developed a stammer. She learnt to manage it and became a professional speaker. She graduated with a Bachelor of Engineering from HKBK College of Engineering, Bangalore.

Career 

After completing her Engineering degree, Sharmin worked for a consulting firm. Sharmin quit her corporate career to become a writer. She self-published a free e-book YOU (You Own Urself), on the subject of getting to know oneself. She subsequently launched her first story-writing product ‘The Speedy-Story-Writing-Wagon’ and founded a company called ‘your-first-book.com’. Sharmin is a theatre enthusiast and started her own production house, ART-RIGHT-IS. She spoke at a Millionaire Maker Seminar.

Literary 

Sharmin's self-published book, YOU, was released in June 2013. YOU was launched on 26 June 2013 in Bangalore by Varun Agarwal and Siva Selvaraj at the Oxford Bookstore, Bangalore. YOU narrates the story of her life from her struggle as a child with speech disfluency to the public speaker that she is today. She later launched YOUR-FIRST-BOOK, which claimed to be a first-of-its-kind story-writing product that provides training and guidance to those who want to start writing.

Theatre 

Sharmin Ali's first performance on stage was at the Alliance française, Bangalore. Soon after she started her own production house ART-RIGHT-IS. She gathered a group of amateurs, professionals and theatre enthusiasts and formed the Artrightis Theatre Group. The most famous shows by Artrightis Theatre Group include Potli Baba Ki Paltan and EREBUS- darkness personified, which were showcased in Bangalore and received critical acclaim.

Plays 
 Potli Baba Ki Paltan was staged On 1 May 2014 at Rangoli Arts Center, MG Road. It was a production performed by a group of amateurs, experts, and theatre enthusiasts. For the first time, there was a combination of gurus and shishyas on stage, being directed by a group of both first-time and expert directors.
 EREBUS- Darkness Personified staged at the Rangoli Metro Arts Centre, MG Road on 14 June 2014. It was a show based on Greek mythology portraying several shades of the Greek God Erebus who personifies darkness. The show describes itself as "An orgasm that lasts for 70 minutes: Self-Hedonism and Paranoia!”. It was staged at the Rangoli Metro Arts Centre, MG Road on 14 June 2014.
 The Penis Monologues was written by Jason Cassidy from the USA and produced by the ART-RIGHT-IS Company in an adaptation for Indian audiences. It explores male attitudes towards sex, women, violence, emotional insecurities and what it’s like to have a penis. While the initial plan was that Ali would direct the play, as the rehearsals began, three directors joined in, each directing the monologues. The Penis Monologues was first staged on 28 August 2014 in Bangalore, India.
 Aurora was staged on 22 November 2014, at Alliance Francaise de Bangalore. Aurora was a collection of short plays.
 Chutzpah  was premiered on 17 April 2015, at Chowdiah Memorial Hall, Bangalore. "Chutzpah", a Hebrew word, refers to audacity, indignance, and the power to do something unconventional. The characters are based on women who have broken free from their inhibitions and defied the stereotype and is a 90-minute musical satire written by Ali herself. A group of activists took offence to the play's title, having mispronounced and misunderstood the title as a vulgar word in Hindi.

References

External links 

 Dimensions Workshop
 Sharmin's Blog
 Ek Sparsh NGO featured in YOU

1988 births
Living people
Delhi Public School alumni
Women writers from West Bengal
Bengali writers
Businesswomen from West Bengal
Indian stage actresses
Indian women dramatists and playwrights
Actresses from West Bengal
Dramatists and playwrights from West Bengal